The Uganda Electoral Commission (EC) provides national elections for a president and a legislature. The president is elected for a five-year term. The Parliament is composed of members directly elected to represent constituencies, and one woman representative for every district; as well representatives of special interest groups,  including the army, youth, workers and persons with disabilities.

Overview
The first national election in Uganda was the Uganda National Assembly election of 1962. An alliance between the Uganda People's Congress (UPC) and Kabaka Yekka (KY) won the majority of parliamentary seats, and formed Uganda's first post-independence government with Obote as executive Prime Minister.

A period of dictatorship and political strife, including the tenures of Idi Amin, Yusuf Lule and Godfrey Binaisa, meant no elections were held until the presidential election of December 1980. Obote was pronounced the winner amid bitter dispute and allegations of electoral fraud. Yoweri Museveni, one of the presidential aspirants, declared an armed rebellion, and waged a guerrilla war (the Ugandan Bush War) against the government of Obote. Museveni's National Resistance Army (NRA) took power in 1986 from the government of Gen. Tito Okello Lutwa who had six months earlier toppled Obote's UPC government in a July 27, 1985 military coup, making him president.

Museveni and his National Resistance Movement (NRM) created a form of "no-party democracy", banning political parties from fielding candidates directly in elections. In the "no-party" presidential election in 1996, Museveni defeated Paul Ssemogerere and Mohamed Mayanja by a landslide. Although international and domestic observers described the vote as valid, both the losing candidates rejected the results. In the following presidential election, held in 2001, Museveni won by a substantial majority, with Kizza Besigye as the only real challenger. Despite a protest against the results, citing massive voter intimidation and rigging, the outcome was accepted by the Supreme Court of Uganda.

In the 2005 constitutional referendum, Ugandans voted to restore a multi-party political system, lifting the 19-year restriction on the activities of political parties. The 2006 general election was the first multiparty election in 25 years. Museveni won 59% of the presidential vote, and his party, the National Resistance Movement, won the majority of parliamentary seats. Pop star and opposition leader with Bobi Wine has announced his intention to challenge Museveni for the presidency in the 2021 election.

Latest elections

Presidential elections

Parliamentary elections

See also

 Electoral calendar
 Electoral system

References

External links
Museveni's Win in the 2011 Elections: What Does it Mean For Uganda's Politics?
Uganda Electoral Commission
Adam Carr's Election Archive
African Elections Database
Voter turnout, Gender quotas, Electoral system design and Political party financing in Uganda